Sultan Hussein Mua'zzam Shah ibni Mahmud Shah Alam (1776 – 5 September 1835) was the 18th ruler of Johor-Riau. He signed two treaties with Britain which culminated in the founding of modern Singapore; during which he was nominally given recognition by the British as the Sultan of Johor and Singapore in 1819 and the Sultan of Johor in 1824.

However, Sultan Hussein was regarded by nobles as a British puppet monarch, at least during the first few years of his reign. Towards his last years of his reign and during the first half of his son's reign as the Sultan of Johor, limited recognition was given by a few nobles. The British were concerned mainly with their own economic and political gains.

Succession dispute
Sultan Mahmud Shah III died in 1812 after reigning for more than fifty years. He named no heir formally. He left behind two sons by two different women, both of whom were of Bugis extraction. The older son, Hussein Shah stood the better chance of succeeding his father by primogeniture over his younger half-brother, Abdul Rahman. Hussein Shah, however, was away in Pahang for his marriage with his wife, Tuan Encik Puan Bulang when his father died in 1811.

The Bugis faction, led by the underking Yamtuan Muda Raja Ja'afar, supported Abdul Rahman as successor and hastily organised a coronation ceremony before Hussein Shah could return. Raja Ja'afar, in exchange for his support for Abdul Rahman (now Sultan), was appointed as Regent and wielded administrative authority. Hussein Shah was in Pahang, waiting for the monsoon winds to arrive, and was unaware of his brother's installation as the Sultan. Raja Ja'afar had written a letter to Hussein Shah, notifying him of Sultan Mahmud's death, but concealed his brother's ascension as the Sultan. Bendahara Tun Ali brought letters to Lingga, reporting Abdul Rahman's coronation during Hussein Shah's stay in Pahang. Hussein Shah sailed from Pahang to Lingga when the monsoon winds arrived, and was received by Sultan Abdul Rahman, who offered to abdicate in his favor. But he quickly backtracked after Raja Ja'afar made threats against Sultan Abdul Rahman. Hussein Shah remained in exile in Penyengat Island of Riau Islands.

Questions pertaining to the legitimacy of Sultan Abdul Rahman's reign were raised; the royal regalia were still in the hands of Engku Putri Hamidah, the primary consort of the late Sultan, who had stated her support for Tengku Hussein as successor. In addition, Hussein Shah also had the support of the Temenggongs and Malay nobles, which made the prospect of putting a legitimate successor in place difficult.

Sultan Abdul Rahman devoted himself increasingly to religion; he had delegated all administrative duties to Raja Ja'afar by the time William Farquhar approached the Sultan to secure an alliance with the British in an attempt to reduce Dutch influence in the region.

Founding of modern Singapore

1819 treaty
In 1818, Sir Stamford Raffles persuaded the British East India Company to establish a new base in the East Indies.

On 29 January 1819, Raffles landed at Singapura, and there he befriended Temenggong Abdul Rahman. Upon learning of these Johor political tensions, Raffles had the Temenggong smuggle Hussein Shah from Penyengat Island to Singapura. Raffles then made a deal with Hussein Shah. The British would recognize Hussein Shah as Sultan of Johor, and pay stipends to Hussein Shah and the Temenggong Abdul Rahman. In return, Hussein Shah would allow Raffles to establish a trading post in Singapore. This treaty was signed on 6 February 1819.
 The Dutch were extremely displeased with Raffles' action.

1824 Anglo-Dutch treaty
Tensions between the Dutch and British over Singapore persisted until 1824, until they signed the Anglo-Dutch Treaty. Under the terms of that treaty, the Dutch officially withdrew their opposition to the British presence in Singapore. The treaty has the effect of carving the Johor into two spheres of influence; modern Johor under the British and the new Sultanate of Riau under the Dutch. The treaty was concluded in London, between the British and the Dutch, effectively breaking up of the Johor-Riau into two.

Later years and death
The British successfully sidelined Dutch political influence by proclaiming Hussein Shah as the Sultan of Johor and Singapore. Hussein Shah's claim to be Sultan of Johor and Singapore was by all accounts not recognised by the Malay rulers and was only a nominal title. Temenggong Abdul Rahman's position, on the other hand, was strengthened as the signing of the treaties detached him the influence of Raja Ja'afar. The Dutch took the bold initiative of taking the royal regalia from Engku Putri Hamidah by force after hearing of rumors of Sultan Hussein requesting British aid to get hold of it. In November 1822, Sultan Abdul Rahman was installed as the Sultan of Lingga, complete with the royal regalia.

In the later part of his reign, growing British influence induced some Malay nobles, particularly Bendahara Ali, to recognize Sultan Hussein Shah. Sultan Abdul Rahman, who had devoted himself to religion, became contented with his political sphere of influence in Lingga, where his family continued to maintain his household under the administrative direction of Raja Ja'afar,
<ref>Bastin, Winks, Malaysia: Selected Historical Readings, pg 132 Though in 1818 Major Farquhar had signed a treaty with the Underking of Riau by virtue of powers granted him by 'Abdu'r-Rahman Sultan of Johor, Pahang and dependencies, and though in his letter suggesting the Carimons (Karimun) for a port he had again referred to 'Abdu'r-Rahman as emperor, he now conveniently remembered that the potentate had deprecated being called ruler of the Johor empire and had declared that he was Sultan of Lingga only. So aware that under Dutch surveillance neither Sultan 'Abdu'r-Rahman of Lingga nor the Underking at Riau would be able to convey any rights at Singapore to the British...</ref> who ruled under the auspices of the Dutch. However, unresolved legal ambiguity in the legitimacy various local affairs, such as the status of Johor and Pahang. These were de jure possessions of Sultan Abdul Rahman and his successors, yet the 1824 treaty barred him as a Dutch vassal from exerting political authority over Johor and Pahang. In the light of these circumstances, the Temenggong and Bendahara increasingly exerted their independent authority. Also, largely as a result of the strong British influence in the Malay Peninsula, the continuously changing political dynamics gradually relegated these legitimacy disputes to irrelevance. (In 1857, the Sultan of Lingga, Sultan Mahmud Muzaffar Shah, who was also de jure head of the royal house of Johor, Pahang and Lingga, made a vociferous claim as the rightful ruler of these states and sparked off a brief civil war in Pahang.)

Sultan Hussein on his part, did not pursue any active claim to his sovereignty rights over Johor, even after Temenggong Abdul Rahman died in 1825, and his successor, Temenggong Daeng Ibrahim was still a youth at the time. Sultan Hussein spent much of his time at his Singapore residence in Istana Kampong Glam until 1834, when he moved to Malacca. Reports cited that he was a dispirited man, apparently with the lack of power and authority that he should be accorded as the Sultan. Sultan Hussein died in September 1835, and was buried near the Tranquerah Mosque at the wishes of his Sultanah and Abdul Kadir, a Tamil-Muslim Imam.

Several of his descendants are buried in Jalan Kubor Cemetery in Singapore.

References

General
 Abdul Aziz, Rahiman, Pembaratan pemerintahan Johor, 1800–1945: Suatu Analisis Sosiologi Sejarah, Dewan Bahasa dan Pustaka, 1997, 
 Bastin, John Sturgus; Winks, Robin W. Malaysia: Selected Historical Readings, Oxford University Press, 1966
 Brazil, David. Street Smart Singapore, Times Books International, 1991, 
 British-American Claims Arbitral Tribunal, American and British Claims Arbitration, Govt. Prtg. Off., 1913
 Gopinath, Aruna. Pahang, 1880–1933: A Political History, Council of the Malaysian Branch of the Royal Asiatic Society, 1991
 Ministry of Culture (Publicity Division), Singapore; Ministry of Communications and Information, Singapore., Singapore: A Ministry of Culture Publication, Ministry of Culture, 1987
 Royal Asiatic Society of Great Britain and Ireland, Journal of the Malaysian Branch of the Royal Asiatic Society, Malaysian Branch, Singapore, 1975
 Scott-Ross, Marcus. See Historical Malacca in One Day, Chopmen Enterprises, 1973
 Tate, D. J. M., The Making of Modern South-East Asia, Oxford University Press, 1979
 Trocki, Carl A. Prince of Pirates: The Temenggongs and the Development of Johor and Singapore, 1784–1885, Singapore University Press, 1979
 Trocki, Carl A. Singapore: Wealth, Power and the Culture of Control, Routledge, 2006, 
 Turnbull, Constance Mary. A Short History of Malaysia, Singapore and Brunei Graham Brash, 1981, 
 Winstedt, R. O. A History of Johore (1365–1941)'', (M.B.R.A.S. Reprints, 6.) Kuala Lumpur: Malaysian Branch of the Royal Asiatic Society, 1992,

External links

1776 births
1835 deaths
House of Bendahara of Johor
People from British Singapore
Sultans of Johor
19th-century monarchs in Asia